is a railway station on the Nippō Main Line operated by JR Kyushu in Tsukumi, Ōita, Japan.

Lines

Layout 
The station has an island platform serving two tracks at grade. A passing loop and a siding branch off track 2. The station building is a modern concrete hashigami structure where the passenger facilities such as the station concourse, a staffed ticket window and waiting area are located on level 2 on a bridge which spans the tracks. The bridge also leads to a second entrance on the south side of the tracks.

Management of the passenger facilities at the station has been outsourced to the JR Kyushu Tetsudou Eigyou Co., a wholly owned subsidiary of JR Kyushu specialising in station services. It staffs the ticket booth which is equipped with a Midori no Madoguchi facility.

Adjacent stations

History
The Kyushu Railway was nationalised on 1 July 1907. Japanese Government Railways (JGR), designated the track as the Hōshū Main Line on 12 October 1909 and expanded it southwards in phases, with Saiki opening as the new southern terminus on 25 October 1916. On the same day, Tsukumi was opened as an intermediate station on the new track. On 15 December 1923, the Hōshū Main Line was renamed the Nippō Main Line. With the privatization of Japanese National Railways (JNR), the successor of JGR, on 1 April 1987, the station came under the control of JR Kyushu.

Passenger statistics
In fiscal 2016, the station was used by an average of 878 passengers daily (boarding passengers only), and it ranked 180th among the busiest stations of JR Kyushu.

See also
List of railway stations in Japan

References

External links 

Tsukumi (JR Kyushu)

Railway stations in Ōita Prefecture
Railway stations in Japan opened in 1916